A marquee player is a player whose wage is paid outside the A-League Men salary cap, with an unlimited salary. Furthermore, there are designated players since the 2021–22 A-League Men season, who are players whose wage is paid outside the salary cap, but have to be in the $300,000 to $600,000 range.

History

Current marquees

Notes
 Table indicates when players signed a marquee contract with their current club, not necessarily their first year in the A-League Men or with the club.

Club marquee history

Notes
 The below list indicates players who have had their contract assigned as a marquee contract during their time in the A-League Men. Players may have not always have had a marquee contract, or have later had their contract negotiated below a marquee contract. Their listed "Years as marquee" indicates what seasons they were active as a marquee for that club only. Players in bold are currently signed to a marquee contract by their club.

Adelaide United

Brisbane Roar

Central Coast Mariners

Gold Coast United

Macarthur FC

Melbourne City

Melbourne Victory

New Zealand Knights

Newcastle Jets

North Queensland Fury

Perth Glory

Sydney FC

Wellington Phoenix

Western Sydney Wanderers

Western United

Marquees by nationality

See also
 Marquee player
 A-League Men#Squad formation and salary cap

References

A-League Men rules and regulations
Association football terminology
 
Association football player non-biographical articles